Polina Alexeyevna Egorova (born on 25 February 2000) is a Russian butterfly and backstroke swimmer. She is two-time Youth Olympic Games champion (2018) and six-time European Games champion (2015).

Career 
Polina was born in Salavat, Bashkortostan. Her first coach is Hanif Skafikov.

Polina competed at the 2015 European Games in Baku, Azerbaijan. She became a six-time champion, won gold medals in 100 and 200 m backstroke, 50 and 100 m butterfly and two-times in relays.

References

External links 
 Polina Egorova  on Russian Swimming Federation website

 
 
 

Russian female butterfly swimmers
2000 births
Living people
Russian female freestyle swimmers
Russian female backstroke swimmers
European Games gold medalists for Russia
European Games medalists in swimming
Swimmers at the 2015 European Games
Swimmers at the 2018 Summer Youth Olympics
Youth Olympic gold medalists for Russia
Sportspeople from Bashkortostan